Dummer or Dümmer may refer to:

Places 

 Dummer, Hampshire, a parish and village in Hampshire, England
 Dummer, New Hampshire, a town in Coös County, New Hampshire, United States
 Dummer, Saskatchewan, a hamlet in Caledonia No. 99 Rural Municipality, Saskatchewan, Canada
 Dummerston, Vermont, a town in Windham County, Vermont, United States
 Dümmer, a lake in southern Lower Saxony, Germany
 Dümmer See, a lake in Mecklenburg-Vorpommern, Germany
 Dümmer, Mecklenburg-Vorpommern, a municipality in the district of Ludwigslust, Germany
 Douro-Dummer, a township in central-eastern Ontario, Canada
 Fort Dummer, a British fort built in 1724 in Vermont

People 
Dummer (surname)

Other 

 Dummer's War (c. 1721–1725), a series of battles between the British and French over control of northern New England
 The Governor's Academy, formerly Governor Dummer Academy, a private preparatory school in the village of Byfield, Newbury, Massachusetts, United States

See also 
 Dumber (disambiguation)